Erkay (Arabic إركي) (also known as Irkey, Erki)  is a small town located in the South of Lebanon (Al Janub) 11 kilometres southeast of Sidon. It has a population of approximately 5000 people.

Geography
Erkay is situated in the Al-Janub (Southern) governorate, southeast from the capital, Beirut, and borders two small towns, ‘Izzah in the east and Khzaz in the west. It is only 36 miles (78 km) from Beirut and only 9 miles (15 km) from Sidon, one of the main ports in Lebanon.  
The town is situated on the Jabal ‘Aamel mountain range which begins from Sidon and stretches throughout the South, making the town’s average altitude 1243 feet (378m) above sea-level. The low population of 4850 people and the vast area of the town resulted in a small population density and hence many houses are scattered at different altitudes within the town region.

Agriculture
Erkay  is well known for producing olive oil due to the white, fertile soil which also helps to grow flavorful figs as well as grapes and general produce. The major river in the South, Al Zahrani, flows next to Irkay and further helps to promote the crop growth and also provides a source of leisure for the residents.

Climate
Irkay is known to have a moderate Mediterranean climate with four distinct seasons. Temperatures range from 8 °C (46 °F) in the winter to 35 °C (95 °F) in the summer. The humidity is usually high in the summer and low in the winter. Snow occurs very rarely, nearly once every couple of years.  This excellent weather makes Irkay an attractive place for visitors.  People come and enjoy most of their summer vacation here if they don’t want to travel outside the country.

History
In the North of the town, at the cliff of the mountain, lie many mysterious caves which have been deserted for hundreds of years. It is believed that deep within the caves are ancient artifacts, like pottery and old ruins dating back to the Romans and the Phoenicians. No-one has ever explored these caves because of their remote location; however the ruins are believed to exist, because over 7000 years ago ancient civilizations inhabited the Levant area (including Lebanon) so that discovery wouldn’t be a surprise. About ten years ago, people from the town were doing excavation work to build a house, when they found a cave, with two old jars inside.

When Erkay  was first emerging over 50 years ago, there were severe tensions between the three major families Nasser, Makki and Chakroun. Occasional brawls leading to injuries would take place. At some point of time the Lebanese army interfered to cool down the tensions. The reasons for clashes among Irkey residents to occur were land problems, multi-political beliefs and possibly due to jealousy caused between families. The people in Irkay survived a major starving episode during the first world war.  Food was limited, where nearly 20% of the population died from hunger.  People started planting their own food in order to survive.  The episode was caused by a locust infestation which flooded the entire country. Food became contaminated therefore many caught diseases during that period of time. It was the worst Irkay has ever experienced.

Erkay  has also survived through many wars and battles such as the Civil War in 1975 and the Israeli invasion in 1978 and 1982. Both wars lasted until the end of the 20th century.  During that time Irkay was occupied by Israeli soldiers, when Israel was in control of the South, and also Irkay was home to many Lebanese militias during the Civil War. In recent history, in July 2006, when the July War began, Irkay was nearly hit by 4 bombs dropped down by Israeli fighter jets and 2 of which landed on ‘Izzah, nearly 1.5 miles (2 km) away from Irkay. The explosion was definitely felt by the residents in Irkay but no harm was done.

Recently the mayor proposed raising taxes in order to pay for the maintenance of the roads and the creation of more social activities. In the end the government decided to fund all of this as gratitude for the people.

Religion
Erkay  residents are mostly Muslims, with some secular families. Athan is raised 5 times a day in the mosque (Al-Masjed) as a calling for all residents to pray. Every Tuesday (El-Tawasull) and Thursday (Kumaill) duaa' is played aloud for residents across the village to participate in such holy prayer. Friday, is remarkable as it combines both the elderly and youngsters together in such a holy prayer called Salat Al-Jumaa'.

Culture
The people in Erkay are known for their continuous cultural activities. Some of these activities include, going down to the river every 3rd week in August and have a picnic where all the residents sing and dance the traditional Lebanese dabke, after enjoying a feast finishing off the traditional Lebanese folklore. 
Irkay has its own mayor, elected by the public every four years. His job is to oversee the government projects such as, maintenance, schools, and clinics, he also communicates with the government, on behalf of the people, to tell them about their concerns and needs. Furthermore, there is a reward given by Irkay to the students, in each grade, who achieve the highest marks at the end of each year.

Traditionally all the houses are built from red bricks and white stone. They also each have a garden where many residents grow their own vegetables and fruits.

Sports
The people of Erkay  enjoy many sports, such as soccer, basketball and volleyball. Every August a soccer tournament is arranged where teams from different villages are invited to participate. Sometimes even players from the Lebanese National team are invited to attend this tournament. The winning team is awarded a trophy and a cash prize. This tournament is a major source of entertainment to the residents of the South.

Sources 
Chakroun, Nadim, Direct Interview, 6 July 2012.
Chakroun, Rami, Direct Interview, 24 June 2013.
Egger, Per. "Irkay, Lebanon Page." Directory of Cities and Towns in Mohafazat Liban-Sud, Lebanon. 1996-2004. Falling Rain Genomics, Inc. 5 Sept. 2008

External links 
 Erkay, Localiban

Populated places in Sidon District